Imode village, commonly referred to as Imode, is a village in Ughelli South Local Government Area of Delta State, Nigeria.

References

Populated places in Delta State